Robin Lavine (born 12 November 1936) is a South African former sports shooter. He competed in the 50 metre rifle, three positions and the 50 metre rifle, prone events at the 1956 Summer Olympics.

References

1936 births
Living people
South African male sport shooters
Olympic shooters of South Africa
Shooters at the 1956 Summer Olympics
Place of birth missing (living people)
20th-century South African people